Orlov let ("Eagle's Flight") was the name of an anti-terrorist operation conducted by the Montenegrin police to arrest a group of Albanians who planned terrorist attacks and an armed conflict in Albanian-inhabited parts of Montenegro. The group of 17 people planned operations from 2004 to their arrest on the night of 10/11 September 2006. Weapons and explosive material were found in police raids. The group's main operative was the destroying of cultural and religious buildings (Orthodox) in Albanian-inhabited territory. The group was organised by an Albanian association based in Detroit, and members of the Kosovo Liberation Army, from which they received financial aid and smuggled arms into Montenegro. The group was given a total sentence of 51 years of prison. Relations between the state and the Albanian minority strained after the event.

References

Sources

External links

2006 in Montenegro
Counterterrorism in Montenegro
Crime in Montenegro
Kosovo Liberation Army
Law enforcement in Montenegro
Law enforcement operations